French submarine Cugnot (Q76) was one of 18 s built for the French Navy during the first decade of the 20th century.

Design and description
The Pluviôse class were built as part of the French Navy's 1905 building program to a double-hull design by Maxime Laubeuf. The submarines displaced  surfaced and  submerged. Their crew numbered 2 officers and 23 enlisted men.
  
For surface running, the boats were powered by two  triple-expansion steam engines, each driving one propeller shaft using steam provided by two Du Temple boilers. When submerged each propeller was driven by a  electric motor.

The first six boats completed were armed with a single  internal bow torpedo tube, but this was deleted from the rest of the submarines after an accident with their sister  in 1909. All of the boats were fitted with six 450 mm external torpedo launchers; the pair firing forward were fixed outwards at an angle of seven degrees and the rear pair had an angle of five degrees. Following a ministerial order on 22 February 1910, the aft tubes were reversed so they too fired forward, but at an angle of eight degrees. The other launchers were a rotating pair of Drzewiecki drop collars in a single mount positioned on top of the hull at the stern. They could traverse 150 degrees to each side of the boat. The Pluviôse-class submarines carried eight torpedoes.

Construction and career
Cugnot, named after the 18th-century inventor Nicolas-Joseph Cugnot, was ordered on 19 October 1906 from the Arsenal de Rochefort. The submarine was laid down in 1906, launched on 14 October 1909 and commissioned on 10 September 1910.

Construction and career
Cugnot, named for the 18th century engineer Joseph Cugnot, was laid down at the Arsenal de Rochefort in October 1906. She was launched on 12 October 1909 and commissioned 10 September 1910.

At the outbreak of the First World War Cugnot was part of the French Mediterranean Fleet, and sailed with that force to the Adriatic tasked with bringing the Austro-Hungarian Fleet to battle or blockading it in its home ports.

On 29 November 1914, under the command of Lt. Henri Fournier, Cugnot attacked the naval base at Cattaro, one of a series of raids by French submarines on Austro-Hungarian ports. 
She was successful in penetrating the net defences at the entrance of Cattaro bay; however, once in she was unable to find a target before being detected and driven off by three Austrian torpedo boats.
For this exploit Fournier was honoured by having a submarine named after him.

Cugnot remained in service throughout the war, and was stricken in December 1919.

Notes

Bibliography

External links
 Castel, Marc: Fresnel at Sous-marins Français 1863 -, pagesperso-orange.fr (French)
 Sieche, Erwin: French naval operations in the Adriatic at gwpda.org

Pluviôse-class submarines
World War I submarines of France
1909 ships
Ships built in France